Death in the Red Jaguar is a 1968 West German thriller film directed by Harald Reinl and starring George Nader, Heinz Weiss, and Daniela Surina. It was part of the Jerry Cotton series of films.

It was shot at the Tempelhof Studios in Berlin and on location in San Francisco. The film's sets were designed by the art director Ernst H. Albrecht.

Plot
The FBI agent tackles an organization of assassins who kill to order.

Cast
George Nader as Jerry Cotton
Heinz Weiss as Phil Decker
Daniela Surina as Ria Payne
Friedrich Schütter as Mr. Clark
Carl Lange as Dr. Saunders
Giuliano Raffaelli as Francis Gordon
Herbert Stass as Sam Parker
Grit Boettcher as Linda Carp
Gert Haucke as Kit Davis
Karin Schröder as Ann Gordon
Kurt Jaggberg as Peter Carp

Release
Death in the Red Jaguar was released in West Germany on 15 August 1968.

References

External links

West German films
1960s crime thriller films
German crime thriller films
German sequel films
Films directed by Harald Reinl
Films set in the United States
Films based on crime novels
Films based on German novels
Constantin Film films
Films shot at Tempelhof Studios
1960s German films